Past and present residents of Potomac, Maryland include:

Atiku Abubakar, billionaire and vice president of Nigeria
Freddy Adu, professional soccer player for Philadelphia Union
Robert A. Altman, owner of ZeniMax Media; married to Lynda Carter
Sam Anas, ice hockey player for Iowa Wild
Surinder Arora,  English hotelier
Mike Barrowman, Olympic champion swimmer
Howard Behrens, painter
Eric F. Billings, CEO of FBR Capital Markets Corporation
Wolf Blitzer, anchor and host of CNN's The Situation Room
Noah Bratschi, professional speed climber, American record holder
Eric Brodkowitz, Israeli-American baseball pitcher for the Israel national baseball team
F. Lennox Campello, artist, art critic, writer and art dealer
Lynda Carter, television actress, best known for her roles of Diana Prince and the title character on Wonder Woman 
Paul Castro, Hollywood screenwriter, best known for being the original writer/creator of the Warner Bros. hit drama, "August Rush"
Calbert Cheaney, NBA player
Michael Chertoff, former Secretary of Homeland Security
Kelen Coleman, actress
Mike Cowan, professional caddy for Jim Furyk
Kamie Crawford, Miss Maryland Teen USA 2010, Miss Teen USA 2010
Donald Dell
Sherman Douglas, basketball player
Margaret Durante, country music artist signed to Emrose Records
Jerome Dyson, basketball player, 2012-13 top scorer in the Israel Basketball Premier League
Patrick Ewing, NBA player and head coach of Georgetown University’s men's basketball team
Kenneth Feld, owner and CEO of Feld Entertainment, producers of Ringling Bros. and Barnum & Bailey Circus
Ben Feldman
Raul Fernandez
Thomas Friedman,  author
Phil Galfond, professional poker player
John Glenn, Senator and astronaut
Jeff Halpern (born 1976), NHL player, the first in league history to be raised in the American South
Beth Harbison, New York Times bestselling author
Ayman Hariri, Lebanese billionaire and son of Rafic Hariri
Leon Harris, anchor for WJLA-TV
Dwayne Haskins, former football quarterback for the Washington Redskins and Pittsburgh Steelers
John Hendricks, founder and former chairman of Discovery Communications
Marillyn Hewson, chairman and CEO of Lockheed Martin
Juwan Howard, former member of the Fab Five, NBA Center, and current Michigan Wolverines basketball head coach.
Karen Huger, Real Housewives of Potomac
E. Howard Hunt, author, CIA Officer and Watergate figure
King Hussein of Jordan
Frank Islam, philanthropist and founder of QSS Group
Nurul Islam, Bangladeshi ex-minister, politician, and economist
Antawn Jamison, NBA player
Yahya Jammeh, President of Gambia
Dhani Jones, NFL player
Eddie Jordan, former NBA coach
Joseph P. Kennedy, Ambassador to the United Kingdom, resided at Marwood Manor
Olaf Kolzig, ice hockey goaltender and coach
Ted Koppel, former ABC News anchor
Ryan Kuehl, NFL player
Paul Laudicina, Chairman and CEO of A.T. Kearney
Sugar Ray Leonard, professional and Olympic champion boxer
Ted Leonsis, owner of the NHL's Washington Capitals, NBA's Washington Wizards, and WNBA's Washington Mystics
Ted Lerner, owner of Lerner Enterprises and MLB's Washington Nationals
Bruce Levenson, owner of NBA's Atlanta Hawks
Barry Levinson, Academy Award-winning director and screenwriter
Liza Levy, Jewish community activist
Chelsea Manning, convicted of violating the Espionage Act
J.W. Marriott, Jr., billionaire executive of Marriott International
Mac McGarry, host of the Washington and Charlottesville, Virginia, versions of It's Academic
Nana Meriwether, Miss Maryland USA 2012, Miss USA 2012 (succeeded)
 Matt Mervis (born 1998), baseball player
Serge Mombouli, Ambassador of Congo 2000-2010
Taylor Momsen, actress from CW TV series Gossip Girl
Alonzo Mourning, NBA player
Gheorghe Muresan, NBA player
Dikembe Mutombo, NBA player
Rachel Nichols, sports journalist, CNN anchor
Queen Noor of Jordan, Queen Consort of Jordan, widow of Hussein of Jordan 
Teodoro Obiang Nguema Mbasogo, President of Equatorial Guinea
Farah Pahlavi, former Queen of Iran
Reza Pahlavi II, Crown Prince of Iran
Benedict Peters, Nigerian billionaire and CEO of Aiteo
Issa Rae, writer, actress, director, producer, author. Co-creator of Insecure
Mitchell Rales, Chairman of the Danaher Corporation
Rosa Rios, Treasurer of the United States
David Ritz, owner of Ritz Camera
Franklin Delano Roosevelt, United States President, occupied Marwood Mansion during the summer
Greg Rosenbaum, co-founder of The Carlyle Group
Pete Sampras, tennis player (moved to California at age 7)
Chris Samuels, former NFL Offensive Tackle, Washington Redskins
Eunice Kennedy Shriver, sister of John, Robert, and Ted Kennedy; mother of Maria Shriver
Sargent Shriver, husband of Eunice Kennedy Shriver; founder of the Peace Corps; former Ambassador to France
Topper Shutt, Chief Meteorologist for WUSA-TV
Donnie Simpson, WPGC 95.5 radio personality; former BET VJ
Daniel Snyder, owner of the NFL's Washington Redskins; former Chairman of the Board of Six Flags
Sylvester Stallone, American actor, screenwriter, and director 
Darren Star
Tim Sweeney, billionaire video game developer, founder of Epic Games
David Trone, businessman and U.S. Congressman
Spike Trotman, founder of Iron Circus Comics
Mike Tyson, professional boxer
John Wall, NBA player for the Houston Rockets
Mark A. Weinberger, Global Chairman and CEO of EY
Robert Wexler, U.S. Congressman
Buck Williams, NBA player
Christopher Williams, NASA astronaut candidate and medical physicist
Gary Williams, former head coach of University of Maryland's basketball team
Willie J. Williams, NFL player

References

 
Potomac, Maryland
Potomac